The Council for Science and Technology (CST) is an advisory non-departmental public body of the United Kingdom government.  Its role is to give advice on issues that cut across government departments to the Prime Minister, the First Minister of Scotland and the First Minister for Wales.  It was established in 1993 and relaunched in 2003.  It is based in London.

The Council has 17 independent members and two co-chairs. Professor Dame Nancy Rothwell chairs meetings where advice is being developed.
Sir Patrick Vallance, the Chief Scientific Adviser and head of the Government Office for Science, chairs meetings reporting its advice to government.

The advisory functions of the CST had previously been performed by the Advisory Council for Applied Research and Development (ACARD), from 1976 to 1987, and the Advisory Council on Science and Technology (ACOST) from 1987 to 1993.

References

 "How research was commissioned and funded", The BSE Inquiry Report, vol.2 pt.1 sect.6

External links
 CST website

2003 establishments in the United Kingdom
Department for Business, Energy and Industrial Strategy
Innovation in the United Kingdom
Non-departmental public bodies of the United Kingdom government
Science advocacy organizations
Scientific organisations based in the United Kingdom